Igreja de Nossa Senhora da Conceição  is a church in Portugal. It is classified as a National Monument.

Churches in Viseu District
National monuments in Viseu District